Rudolph Nickolsburger (born 21 March 1899, Hungary; died New York, December 1969), also referred to as Nikolsburger Rezső and Rudy Nichols, was a Hungarian footballer who played for Ferencvárosi TC, SC Hakoah Wien and Hungary. He later emigrated to the United States where he played for New York Hakoah and Hakoah All-Stars.

Club career

Nickolsburger played for Ferencvárosi TC during the early 1920s before leaving Budapest in 1922 to join Makkabi Brno in Czechoslovakia. This club consisted almost exclusively of Hungarian Jews. In the mid-1920s, Nickolsburger played in Italy. A Béla Nikolsbuger played as a centre forward for Forli during the 1925–26 season. This may be the same player.

In March 1927 Nickolsburger moved to Austria and joined the all-Jewish club SC Hakoah Wien. Then in April and May 1927 he joined the club on their second tour of the United States. He played in several games on the tour, scoring twice against the New York Giants. He then returned to Austria and started the 1927–28 season with SC Hakoah Wien.  However, by 1928 he was back in the United States playing for New York Hakoah of the Eastern Soccer League, a team made-up of former SC Hakoah Wien players, including Béla Guttmann. In subsequently helped them win the 1929 National Challenge Cup. After a merger with Brooklyn Hakoah, they became the Hakoah All-Stars and entered the American Soccer League in the fall of 1929. Between 1929 and 1931 Nickolsburger played 84 league games and scored 30 goals for the All-Stars in the American Soccer League. His last confirmed game was on 12 June 1932 against the Bohemian Americans.

Hungarian international

While with Ferencvárosi TC, Nickolsburger also played twice for Hungary. He made his international debut in 1920 against Austria. On 17 May 1925 he also played for a Hungary XI in a 4–1 win against a visiting Bolton Wanderers.

Later years

Nickolsburger spent his later years in and around The Bronx, New York.  His wife, Mary Tóth Nichols died in 1992.  A son Leslie (Laszlo), who was born in Budapest in 1927, died in February 2006.  His surviving daughter, Norma Lee Nichols Mahdavi, resides in New York.  Nickolsburger's grandchildren, great-grandchildren and great-great grandchildren have settled in Florida, Vermont, Spain and Norway.

Honours
New York Hakoah

National Challenge Cup
1929: 1

References

External links
 Nickolsburger at www.jewsinsports.org
 List of Hungarian football internationals
Unofficial International Appearance
Hungarians in Italy at www.rsssf.com
Nickolsburger at www.familysearch.org

1899 births
1969 deaths
People from the Kingdom of Hungary
Austro-Hungarian Jews
Jewish Hungarian sportspeople
Jewish footballers
Hungarian footballers
Hungarian expatriate footballers
Hungary international footballers
Ferencvárosi TC footballers
SC Hakoah Wien footballers
American Soccer League (1921–1933) players
Hakoah All-Stars players
Eastern Professional Soccer League (1928–29) players
New York Hakoah players
Association football forwards
Expatriate soccer players in the United States
Hungarian expatriate sportspeople in the United States
Expatriate footballers in Czechoslovakia
Hungarian expatriate sportspeople in Czechoslovakia
Hungarian emigrants to the United States